Kuban State Agrarian University is a university located in Krasnodar, a city in southern Russia.

Faculties

Agriculture
  Agronomical faculty
  Agrochemistry
  Plant protection
  Veterinary medicine
  Zooengineering and managemanet
  Fruit and vegetable cultivation
 Viticulture

Engineering
  Processing technologies
  Engineering and land use planning
  Land cadastre
  Water engineering and melioration
  Water supply and water removal
  Construction engineering
  Architectural engineering
  Mechanical faculty
  Power engineering and electrification

Economics
  Economics
  Financial accounting
  Finance and credit
  Applied information science
  Digital Economics (since 2022)

Other
  Administration
  Faculty of Law

References

External links

Universities in Krasnodar
Agricultural universities and colleges in Russia